KQPT-LP is a low power FM radio station broadcasting out of Sacramento, California and licensed to Sacramento Area Peace Action. It began broadcasting as KAKP-LP on August 27, 2017.

References

External links

2017 establishments in California
QPT-LP
Radio stations established in 2017
QPT-LP